Tony Rossi (born December 11, 1943) is an American college baseball coach and former player, currently serving as head coach of the Siena Saints baseball program.  He was named to that position prior to the 1970 season.  Rossi is the longest tenured coach with the same institution in NCAA Division I baseball, and only Augie Garrido has been a head coach for more years than Rossi.

Rossi played at Brockport State, now SUNY Brockport for three seasons, turning down professional offers from the Los Angeles Dodgers and Cincinnati Reds in order to complete his degree.  After ending his playing days, he briefly coached lacrosse at Siena before becoming head baseball coach of the then-NCAA Division II Saints.  Under Rossi, the Saints transitioned to NCAA Division I, claimed five Metro Atlantic Athletic Conference championships, made two NCAA Tournaments, and placed three players in the Major Leagues, most notably John Lannan.  Rossi has earned six MAAC Coach of the Year awards.

Rossi grew up in Schenectady and taught middle school math for more than 30 years in addition to his coaching job.

Head coaching record
This table shows Rossi's record as a head coach.

See also
List of current NCAA Division I baseball coaches

References

1943 births
Living people
Brockport Golden Eagles baseball players
Siena Saints baseball coaches
Sportspeople from Schenectady, New York
Baseball coaches from New York (state)
Schoolteachers from New York (state)